Nissene på låven is a Nordic Christmas calendar that aired on TVNorge in 2001, and is a spoof of reality TV.

A sequel, Nissene over skog og hei, aired in 2011.

Plot
24 Santas are gathered in a barn to compete for the title of the best Santa. They are split into two teams, the grey beards (gråskjeggnissene) and the white beards (hvitskjeggnissene). Every day they compete in contests related to Christmas. The losing team has to meet in "låvetinget" ("the barn parliament") to vote out a member of their team. They're voted out one by one until the strongest Santa is left on Christmas Eve.

Cast

Ratings
Nissene på låven had an average rating of 368,000 viewers.

External links
Snurrfilm.no
filmfront.no

References

TVNorge original programming
Norwegian comedy television series
Reality television series parodies
2001 Norwegian television series debuts
2001 Norwegian television series endings
Christmas television series